The National Census of 1936 was the 3rd comprehensive national census of the Union of South Africa, following its formation in 1910. It undertook to enumerate every person present in South Africa on the census night. It was the first South African census to tabulate non-European languages and languages spoken at home by all major demographic groups.

Pre-enumeration

Enumeration

Post-enumeration Survey

Results

Demographics

City rankings

See also

 Census in South Africa
 South African National Census of 2001
 Demographics of South Africa

References

Censuses in South Africa
1936 in South Africa
1936 censuses